Stanley Brogden (15 March 1910 – 18 June 1981) was an English rugby union, and professional sprinter and rugby league footballer who played in the 1920s, 1930s and 1940s.

Background

Stan Brogden's birth was registered in Holbeck, Leeds, West Riding of Yorkshire, England, and he died aged 71 in Bradford, West Yorkshire, England.

Playing career

International honours
Stan Brogden won caps for England (RL) while at Bradford Northern in 1929 against Other Nationalities, while at Huddersfield in 1932 against Wales (2 matches), in 1933 against Other Nationalities, and Australia, while at Leeds in 1935 against France, and Wales, in 1936 against Wales (2 matches), and France, in 1938 against Wales, while at Hull in 1938 against Wales, in 1939 against France, in 1941 against Wales, in 1943 against Wales, and won caps for Great Britain (RL) while at Huddersfield in 1929–30 against Australia, in 1932 against Australia (3 matches), and New Zealand (3 matches), in 1933 against Australia (2 matches), while at Leeds in 1936 against Australia (3 matches), and New Zealand (2 matches), and in 1937 against Australia (2 matches).

In 1936, fellow tourist Arthur Atkinson counted Brogden's try in a tour match against New South Wales at Sydney as his most memorable moment in rugby to that date. He said

Championship final appearances
Stan Brogden played left-, i.e. number 4, in Leeds' 2–8 defeat by Hunslet in the Championship Final during the 1937–38 season at Elland Road, Leeds on Saturday 30 April 1938.

Challenge Cup Final appearances
Stan Brogden played right-, i.e. number 3, in Huddersfield's 21–17 victory over Warrington in the 1933 Challenge Cup Final during the 1932–33 season at Wembley Stadium, London on Saturday 6 May 1933.

County Cup Final appearances
Stan Brogden played left-, i.e. number 4, in Leeds' 14–8 victory over Huddersfield in the 1937–38 Yorkshire County Cup Final during the 1937–38 season at Belle Vue, Wakefield on Saturday 30 October 1937.

Club career
Between 1929 and 1934, Brogden made 156 appearances for Huddersfield, scoring 90 tries. Brogden made his début for Leeds against Wakefield Trinity at Belle Vue, Wakefield on Friday 30 March 1934.

Transfer records
In 1929, Huddersfield paid Bradford Northern a fee of £1000 for Stan Brogden (based on increases in average earnings, this would be approximately £158,200 in 2013). In 1934, Leeds paid Huddersfield a then world record fee of £1200 for Stan Brogden (based on increases in average earnings, this would be approximately £206,800 in 2013).

References

External links
Tickle follows Lydon's lead
(archived by web.archive.org) Bradford Bulls – The Millennium Masters – Backs
Leeds Rhinos : News : ON THIS DAY 30 March
Leeds Rhinos : News : ON THIS DAY 15 March
 (archived by web.archive.org) Stats → PastPlayers → B at hullfc.com
 (archived by web.archive.org) Statistics at hullfc.com
Rugby League players and country sports events
Photograph "Stanley Brogden" at rlhp.co.uk
Photograph "Bradford Northern 1927/28" at rlhp.co.uk
Photograph "Four Northern Greats" at rlhp.co.uk
Photograph "Rugby League v Rugby Union" at rlhp.co.uk
Search for "Stanley Brogden" at britishnewspaperarchive.co.uk
Search for "Stan Brogden" at britishnewspaperarchive.co.uk

1910 births
1981 deaths
Bradford Bulls players
England national rugby league team players
English rugby league players
English rugby union players
Great Britain national rugby league team players
Huddersfield Giants players
Hull F.C. players
Leeds Rhinos players
People from Holbeck
Rochdale Hornets players
Rugby league centres
Rugby league five-eighths
Rugby league players from Leeds
Rugby league wingers
Rugby union players from Leeds
Salford Red Devils players
St Helens R.F.C. players
Yorkshire rugby league team players